Saint Cetteus (or Ceteus, also known as Peregrinus, Pelligrinus, Pellegrino) (d. June 13, 597) is the patron saint of Pescara.  He was a bishop of the 6th century, elected to the see of Amiternum in Sabina (today the city of San Vittorino) in 590, during the pontificate of Gregory the Great.   
 
According to a largely legendary Passio, during Cetteus’ episcopate, Amiternum was occupied by two Lombard captains, Alai and Umbolus.  Cetteus, because he refused to support this occupation, fled to Rome.  Pope Gregory convinced Cetteus to return, however, after receiving a promise from the Lombards that they would treat the city's inhabitants with humanity.  However, a dispute broke out between Alai and Umbolus, and Alai sided with Count Verilianus of Orte, who occupied Amiternum at night.  When the city's inhabitants woke up to this occupation, they wanted to kill Alai, but Cetteus intervened, and Alai was simply imprisoned but not killed.  Umbolus, meanwhile, believed that Cetteus was an ally of Alai, and ordered the bishop's immediate execution.

He was executed by having a large stone tied around his neck, being thrown off a bridge and into the Aterno-Pescara.  His body floated to Pescara, where it was discovered by fishermen.  They buried the body, whose vestments they recognized as those of a bishop, but not knowing the bishop's name, they called him Peregrinus (Peregrino), meaning "traveller" or "pilgrim."  The saint's name was eventually discovered, and the body was buried in the church in Pescara that was later dedicated to him, San Cetteo.  This church is now Pescara Cathedral.
       
Although largely legendary, the Passio is probably correct in placing Cetteus' death at the time of the Lombard invasion.

References 

 Nicholas Everett, Patron Saints of Early Medieval Italy AD c.350-800 (PIMS/ Durham University Press, 2016), pp. 104–123. 
Nicholas Everett, 'The Passion of Cetheus of Pescara and the Lombard Invasion of Italy. With a diplomatic edition of Passio Cethei based on Venice, Biblioteca Marciana lat. Z 356”, Hagiographica 22 (2015), 79-132.

External links
 San Ceteo (Peregrinus) di Amiterno

597 deaths
Medieval Italian saints
Bishops in Abruzzo
6th-century Italian bishops
6th-century Christian martyrs
6th-century executions
People executed by drowning
Executed Italian people
Year of birth unknown